Tilla Durieux (born Ottilie Godeffroy; 18 August 1880 – 21 February 1971) was an Austrian theatre and film actress of the first decades of the 20th century.

Early Years
Born Ottilie Helene Angela Godeffroy
on 18 August 1880, she was the daughter of the Austrian chemist Richard Max Victor Godeffroy (1847–1895) and his wife, the Hungarian pianist Adelheid Ottilie Augustine Godeffroy (née Hrdlicka, died 1920), who was born in Romania. After graduating from elementary school, she switched to the public school in Vienna's 9th district. She was baptized in the evangelical parish Augsburg Confession in Vienna.

Career
She trained as an actress in Vienna, her native town, and made her debut at the Moravian Theatre in Olmütz (Olomouc) in 1902. Since her mother refused her career choice, she later adopted the stage name Durieux, derived from du Rieux, the maiden name of her paternal grandmother. The next season she got an engagement in Breslau (Wrocław since 1945). From 1903 she worked with Max Reinhardt at the Deutsches Theater in Berlin and with a group of expressionist artists around Kurt Hiller and Jakob van Hoddis. In 1911 Durieux entered the stage of the Lessing Theater where, on 1 November 1913, she became the second actress to perform the role Eliza Doolittle in a German language production of George Bernard Shaw's play Pygmalion, half a year before its English premiere on 11 April 1914. From 1915 she performed at the Royal Schauspielhaus Berlin.

Marriages
In 1904, Durieux married the Berlin Secession painter Eugen Spiro, whose younger sister was Baladine Klossowska. They divorced consensually in 1905, after she had fallen in love with Paul Cassirer.

She started dating the successful art dealer and editor and they got married in 1910. The marriage lasted 16 years, however Cassirer was very affected when Durieux wanted to divorce him. Unfortunately Cassirer had asserted various defamations against Durieux and was obviously not willing to continue without her. When their divorce was declared in 1926, Cassirer committed suicide in a room next to the court room where their hearing had taken place (1926).

Soon after, Durieux married general director Ludwig Katzenellenbogen. In 1927 they were the main financiers of Erwin Piscator's Neues Schauspielhaus project. Durieux was a public character of 1920s Berlin and associated with numerous celebrities like the photographer Frieda Riess.

Escape from Germany
In 1933, Durieux and Katzenellenbogen left Germany for Switzerland to escape Nazi rule. She continued to perform at the Vienna Theater in der Josefstadt and in Prague. In 1937 she moved to Zagreb, Croatia (then in the Kingdom of Yugoslavia) where she became a member of the International Red Aid. Durieux unsuccessfully tried to obtain visa for the United States; in 1941 Ludwig Katzenellenbogen was arrested by Gestapo agents in Thessaloniki and deported to Sachsenhausen concentration camp. He died in 1944 at Jüdisches Krankenhaus Berlin.

Return and late Years
Durieux managed to return to West Germany in 1952, appearing on stages in Berlin, Hamburg, and Münster. The plays in which she performed included A Dream Play by August Strindberg, The Chinese Wall by Max Frisch, and Atriden by Gerhart Hauptmann.

In 1971 Durieux underwent surgery for a hip fracture and died of post-operative sepsis. Despite the fact that the date on her gravestone is 21 January 1971, she died on the 21st of February 1971, which would have been the 100th birthday of Paul Cassirer.

Art collection 
Durieux's marriage to her second husband, Paul Cassirer, brought her into the world of art collecting. In addition to family portraits, the Tilla Durieux and Paul Cassirer Collection included modern works of art. When she and her third husband, Ludwig Katzenellenbogen, emigrated from Nazi Germany in 1933, they took some artworks with them. Katzenellenbogen was arrested by the Gestapo in Saloniki in 1941. Deported to the Sachsenhausen concentration camp, he died in Berlin.

Tilla Durieux’s collection was integrated into the  Zlata Lubienski Art Collection. On November 13, 1945, the Commission for Gathering and Protecting of Cultural Monuments and Antiques proclaimed that the Zlata Lubienski Art Collection was a ‘protected’ collection under the Section for Museums of the Department of Art and Culture of the Ministry of Education of the Federal Republic of Croatia. Scholars have emphasized the ambigious meaning of the word "protection". Zlata Lubienski and Tilla Durieux contested the decision but were denied.

On February 17, 1982, the City Institute for the Conservation of Cultural and Natural Heritage for the City Council in Zagreb gave a permit for the export of the Tilla Durieux Collection. A Commission whose members included Ida Slade Šilović (City Institute for the Conservation of Cultural and Natural Heritage for the City Council in Zagreb), Zdenko Kuzmić and Zdenka Kazmar (City Museum in Zagreb), Dubravka Osrečki (Committee for Public Affairs) and Ljiljana Poljak (from City Administration) was established. The Tilla Durieux Collection was divided, leaving nineteen art works in Zagreb as a part of a new Tilla Durieux Collection at the City Museum in Zagreb while 58 items were exported to Germany, where many were sold.

The heirs of Ludwig Katzenellenbogen and his ex-wife Estella have listed fifty artworks with the German Lost Art Foundation.

Filmography

See also 
The Holocaust in the Independent State of Croatia

References

External links 

Tilla Durieux and her Art Collection
Portrait of Tilla Durieux painted by Renoir: Metropolitan Museum of Art
Spielen und traeumen, a 1922 autobiographical work on Durieux's childhood at the Leo Baeck Institute, New York

Austrian stage actresses
Austrian film actresses
Austrian silent film actresses
Austrian television actresses
Austrian expatriates in Germany
Austrian expatriates in Switzerland
Austrian expatriates in Croatia
Actresses from Vienna
1880 births
1971 deaths
Commanders Crosses of the Order of Merit of the Federal Republic of Germany
20th-century Austrian actresses
Emigrants from Nazi Germany to Switzerland
Austrian art collectors